The Hutton Mountains are a group of mountains in southeastern Palmer Land, Antarctica, bounded on the southwest by Johnston Glacier, on the northwest by Squires Glacier, on the north by Swann Glacier, and on the east by Keller Inlet. The mountains were observed and photographed from the air by the Ronne Antarctic Research Expedition, 1947–48, they were mapped by the United States Geological Survey from surveys and U.S. Navy air photos, 1961–67, and were named by the Advisory Committee on Antarctic Names after James Hutton, a Scottish geologist.

References

Mountain ranges of Palmer Land